The Presidents is a 2005 American documentary television series about the history of each President of the United States of America, narrated by Edward Herrmann.

The show documents each of the Presidents in the union, starting with George Washington, following a chronological order to George W. Bush. Each President's segment begins with the narrator giving a brief dossier about each one, from their political affiliation, family, and notable traits. The show then highlights the history behind each presidency, linking each one to the following.

Episodes
It has been released onto DVD twice. First on May 31, 2005 and subsequently again on April 17, 2012 with an updated version.

Awards and nominations

The documentary ended up as a finalist in two categories (Biography/Profiles and Writing) at the New York Festivals.

See also
 List of programs broadcast by History (TV channel)
 History Channel

References

History (American TV channel) original programming